The Montage programs, a filmed history of the 1960s and 1970s with a Cleveland perspective, are composed of more than three hundred documentary films which were shown primarily on WKYC-TV, Cleveland's NBC affiliate, from September 1965 to December 1978. The series was produced and directed by Dennis Goulden.

History 
In 1955, NBC forced Westinghouse Broadcasting to trade its NBC-affiliated Philadelphia station WPTZ-TV to NBC in exchange for WNBK-TV in Cleveland.  In 1965, NBC was forced to reverse the trade on orders from the Federal Communications Commission (FCC) and Justice Department. When NBC regained control of the Cleveland station, it renamed it WKYC-TV and moved several shows from Philadelphia to Cleveland.  One of these was the documentary series Montage, and Goulden became executive producer of the show.

Montage profiled local personalities, such as the director of the Cleveland Orchestra Lorin Maazel and Cleveland Browns coach Paul Brown, and national ones such as Olympic skater Jo Jo Starbuck and Oscar-nominated actor William Gargan.  It also looked at national issues with a local perspective.  Pollution, race, homosexuality, drugs, crime, housing, education, medical advancements, the Vietnam War, and many other issues were examined.  Some shows had guest hosts, including Bill Cosby and Robert Stack.  The Montage unit traveled to Australia, Asia, Europe, and South America to pursue stories.  These shows were often broadcast on the other NBC owned-and-operated stations, PBS stations, and others.  In 1976, the show experimented with a magazine format for several of the shows.

Goulden produced the show until 1978, when the show was cancelled.  During that time over 300 episodes were produced.  The show won dozens of Emmys and dozens more nominations, and hundreds of other awards.  Several of the completed shows, as well as raw footage, audio, scripts, production notes, and other materials were given by Dennis Goulden and WKYC-TV to the library at Cleveland State University in 1980.

Cast and crew 
Doug Adair – Narrator
John Beyer – Writer, Associate Producer
Jon Boynton – Writer, Producer
Virgil Dominic – Narrator
Dennis Goulden – Unit Manager, Executive Producer, Producer, director, Writer, Cinematographer, Film Editor
Terri Harken – Associate Producer
Bill Leonard – Writer, Producer
Gary Miller – Associate Producer
Dick Mrzena – Editor
Gary Robinson – Producer, Director, Writer
Paul Schoenwetter – Writer, Director, Associate Producer
Howard Schwartz – Producer, Director, Writer

Partial list of participants 
Roy Acuff
Art Arfons
Bob Babich
Rudy and Janet Bachna
Jim Bede
Jim Brown
Paul Brown
Nigel Butterley
Alvin Dark
Leo Durocher
Donald Erb
Dick Feagler
William Gargan
Don Gentile
Forrest Gregg
John A. Hannah
Robert Hooks
Ron Karenga
Jack Kemp
Wally Kinnan
Daryle Lamonica
Sherman Lee
Richard Lugar
Janet Lynn
Lorin Maazel
Russell Means
Ralph Nader
Dennis Nahat
Mary Rose Oakar
Ray Osrin
Gabe Paul
Webb Pierce
Jackie Presser
Greg Pruitt
Tex Ritter
Frank Robinson
Lou Saban
Moshe Safdie
John Seiberling
Kenneth Shelly
Jo Jo Starbuck
Carl Stokes
Louis Stokes
Birdie Tebbetts
Stewart Udall
Raymond Wilding-White

References

External links 
Cleveland State University Montage Collection

Television in Cleveland
1965 American television series debuts
1978 American television series endings
1960s American documentary television series
1970s American documentary television series